is a Japanese architect and patent attorney. He is Principal Patent Attorney of Sugimura & Partners.

Early life
Sugimura was born in Tokyo, in 1953 as a grandson of Nobuchika Sugimura, the founder of Sugimura International Patent and Trademark Attorneys. He went to Musashi High School and Waseda University, where he majored in architecture.

Career

Architect
Sugimura is a registered architect in Japan and the U.K. He was employed in the architectural firm of Norman Foster in London from 1978 to 1983, and was a representative in Hong Kong from 1983 to 1986. He was involved in the construction of the Hong Kong and Shanghai Bank Headquarters in Hong Kong.

Then he founded, with his partner Roy Fleetwood, the architectural firm Sugimura Fleetwood Architects and Engineers in Tokyo in 1988.

Patent attorney
After a 25-year career as an architect, Sugimura became a patent attorney. In 2006, he succeeded to the family business and took over the presidency of Sugimura International Patent and Trademark Attorneys. He is involved in IP organizations, such as AIPPI, APAA, FICPI, INTA, and the JPAA. He serves as a member of the board of FICPI-Japan and on JPAA's International Activities Center subcommittee. He has authored several articles on Japanese IP practice in international IP magazines. His writings focus on new changes and trends in Japanese IP practice, general differences between Japanese IP practice and IP practices in the US and Europe, and industry specific opportunities within the Japanese IP market. He was elected as a vice president of JPAA in 2020.

Main works 
 YKK Manufacturing and Engineering Centre (1992)
 Setagaya Literary Museum (1995)

Awards
G-Mark Award from the Japan Industrial Design Promotion Organization (YKK Manufacturing and Engineering Centre)	
Ecomark Award from the Japan Environment Association (YKK Manufacturing and Engineering Centre)

Publications
N. Foster, K. Sugimura, 
Kenji Sugimura, 
Kenji Sugimura, 
N. Foster, D. Sudjic, T. Fitzpatrick, M. Glover, C. Seddon, K. Sugimura, J. Zunz, 
N. Foster, T. Nakamura, C. Abel, C. Seddon, K. Sugimura, 
Kenji Sugimura, 
Kenji Sugimura, 
Kenji Sugimura et al., 
Kenji Sugimura,  
Kenji Sugimura,  Takahiro Yamazaki, 
Kenji Sugimura, Rebecca Chen, 
Kenji Sugimura, Rebecca Chen, 
Kenji Sugimura, Rebecca Chen,

References

1953 births
Living people
Japanese architects
People from Tokyo
Waseda University alumni
Japanese patent attorneys